Jose Enrique Briones (born October 22, 1980), better known as Henry Briones, is a Mexican mixed martial artist and competed in Bantamweight division of the Ultimate Fighting Championship (UFC).

Background
Briones grew up in Tijuana playing inline hockey due to the lack of ice hockey rinks in his native Mexico. For his senior year in the high school, Henry moved to live with his aunt in Tulsa, Oklahoma in pursuit of professional ice hockey career. However, his dream did not materialize and he returned to Mexico to attend law school. Compared to most of the mixed martial arts fighters, Briones started combat sport much later in life. He started training MMA when he joined ENTRAM gym at the age of 26.

Mixed martial arts career

Early career
Briones fought primary in the Mexico circuit and amassed a record of 15-4–1 prior joining the UFC. Initially, Briones tried out for UFC's Latin America developmental program and was accepted into it.

The Ultimate Fighter
After training at Jackson's MMA for over a year at UFC's expense, he was a participant in The Ultimate Fighter: Latin America 1, an installment of the Ultimate Fighting Championship (UFC) produced reality TV series "The Ultimate Fighter" in May 2014. He faced Marlon Vera on quarter-final round and lost the fight, failing to be selected as one of the contestants of the show.

Ultimate Fighting Championship
Briones made his promotional debut on November 15, 2014, at UFC 180 in Mexico City  against Guido Cannetti. He won the fight via rear-nake choke in round two. He earned a Fight of the Night bonus for his performance.

He next faced  Cody Garbrandt on July 11, 2015, at UFC 189. He lost the fight via unanimous decision.

The match was rescheduled to  UFC Fight Night: Arlovski vs. Barnett six months later on September 3, 2016, and the bout was removed where Briones for undisclosed reasons and was replaced by  Iuri Alcântara.

On November 5, 2016, Brinoes took on  Douglas Silva de Andrade at UFC Fight Night: Dos Anjos vs. Ferguson. A spinning back fist  from  Silva de Andrade sent Briones to the ground and he lost the fight on round 3.

The bout between Briones and Brad Pickett was rescheduled for the third time on March 18, 2017, at UFC Fight Night: Manuwa vs. Anderson, and yet again the bout was cancelled due to Briones withdrew from the fight one week before the event and was replaced by Marlon Vera.

Briones faced Rani Yahya on August 5, 2017, at UFC Fight Night: Pettis vs. Moreno. He lost the fight via a kimura submission in the first round.

Briones faced Frankie Saenz on May 19, 2018, at UFC Fight Night 129. He lost the fight by unanimous decision.

On November 5, 2019, it was announced that Briones had been released from the UFC following four straight losses in the promotion.

Personal life
Briones' moniker "Bure" was coined by hockey fans where they saw the similarity between Briones and the Russian ice hockey player, Pavel Bure, during his high school years when Brones played hockey league in Mexico. Briones decided to keep the nickname given by fans to honour them where he spent 14 years of his life in the sport.

Briones worked in a law firm during the weekdays and worked as a bar tender during the weekends prior fight professionally.

Championships and accomplishments

Mixed martial arts
Cage Gladiators 
Cage Gladiators Lightweight Champion (One time) 
Ultimate Fighting Championship
Fight of the Night (One time) vs. Guido Cannetti

Mixed martial arts record

|- 
|Loss
|align=center|16–8–1
|Frankie Saenz
|Decision (unanimous)
|UFC Fight Night: Maia vs. Usman
|
|align=center|3
|align=center|5:00
|Santiago, Chile
|
|-
|Loss
|align=center| 16–7–1
|Rani Yahya
|Submission (kimura)
|UFC Fight Night: Pettis vs. Moreno
|
|align=center|1
|align=center|2:01
|Mexico City, Mexico
|
|-
| Loss
| align=center| 16–6–1
| Douglas Silva de Andrade
| TKO (spinning backfist)
|The Ultimate Fighter Latin America 3 Finale: dos Anjos vs. Ferguson
| 
| align=center| 3
| align=center| 2:33
| Mexico City, Mexico
|
|-
| Loss
| align=center| 16–5–1
| Cody Garbrandt
| Decision (unanimous)
| UFC 189
| 
| align=center| 3
| align=center| 5:00
| Las Vegas, Nevada, United States
|
|-
| Win
| align=center| 16–4–1
| Guido Cannetti
| Submission (rear-naked choke)
| UFC 180
| 
| align=center| 2
| align=center| 1:44
| Mexico City, Mexico
| 
|-
| Draw
| align=center| 15–4–1
| Adrian Cruz
| Draw (split)
| Legacy Fighting Championship 30
| 
| align=center| 3
| align=center| 5:00
| Albuquerque, New Mexico, United States
|
|-
| Win
| align=center| 15–4
| Jeff Golden
| Submission (arm-triangle choke)
| Total Fight Championship 3
| 
| align=center| 3
| align=center| 0:35
| Manzanillo, Mexico
|
|-
| Win
| align=center| 14–4
| Jared Carlsten
| KO (punch) 
| MEZ Sports: Pandemonium 7
| 
| align=center| 1
| align=center| 0:32
| Inglewood, California, United States
|
|-
| Win
| align=center| 13–4
| Fernando Rodriguez
| TKO (punches)
| TSC 2
| 
| align=center| 1
| align=center| 0:00
| Monterrey, Mexico
|
|-
| Win
| align=center| 12–4
| Manuel Ramos Gallareta
| Decision (unanimos)
| Ultimate Warrior Challenge Mexico 12
| 
| align=center| 3
| align=center| 5:00
| Tijuana, Mexico
|
|-
| Win
| align=center| 11–4
| Ismael Vasquez Segura
| TKO (punches) 
| Ultimate Warrior Challenge Mexico 11
| 
| align=center| 1
| align=center| 3:34
| Tijuana, Mexico
|
|-
| Win
| align=center| 10–4
| Eddie Mendez
| TKO (punches)
| Mexico Fighter 3
| 
| align=center| 1
| align=center| 4:41
| Sonora, Mexico
|
|-
| Loss
| align=center| 9–4
| Brady Harrison
| Decision (split)
| Ultimate Warrior Challenge Mexico 10
| 
| align=center| 3
| align=center| 5:00
| Tijuana, Mexico
|
|-
| Win
| align=center| 9–3
| Chris Kogel
| TKO (corner stoppage)
| Baja Cage Fighting 1
| 
| align=center| 1
| align=center| 4:30
| Tijuana, Mexico
|
|-
| Win
| align=center| 8–3
| Joe Gustina
| Submission (rear-naked choke)
| Cage Gladiators 3
| 
| align=center|2
| align=center|N/A
| Mexico
| 
|-
| Loss
| align=center| 7–3
| Alex Soto
| Decision (split)
| Ultimate Warrior Challenge Mexico 5
| 
| align=center| 3
| align=center| 5:00
| Tijuana, Mexico
|
|-
| Win
| align=center| 7–2
| Esteban Velazco
| TKO (punches)
| Club Maya: Briones vs. Velasco
| 
| align=center| 1
| align=center| 1:48
| Rosarito, Mexico
|
|-
| Loss
| align=center| 6–2
| Mike de la Torre
| Decision (unanimous)
| Ultimate Challenge Mexico 12
| 
| align=center| 5
| align=center| 5:00
| Tijuana, Mexico
|
|-
| Win
| align=center| 6–1
| Juan Delgado
| Submission (triangle choke)
| Ultimate Warrior Challenge Mexico 3
| 
| align=center| 1
| align=center| 3:11
| Tijuana, Mexico
|
|-
| Win
| align=center| 5–1
| Hidred Oliney
| Submission (triangle choke)
| Ultimate Warrior Challenge Mexico 2
| 
| align=center| 1
| align=center| 4:18
| Tijuana, Mexico
|
|-
| Loss
| align=center| 4–1
|Bobby Green
| Submission (triangle choke)
| Ultimate Challenge Mexico 5
| 
| align=center| 1
| align=center| 0:48
|Tijuana, Mexico
|
|-
| Win
| align=center| 4–0
| Sipanhya Koummalasy
| KO (punches)
| Ultimate Challenge Mexico 3
| 
| align=center| 1
| align=center| 0:00
| Mexico
|
|-
| Win
| align=center| 3–0
| Mario Zarate
| TKO (punches)
| Ultimate Challenge Mexico 2
| 
| align=center| 1
| align=center| 0:00
| Tijuana, Mexico
|
|-
| Win
| align=center| 2–0
| Juan Manuel Torres
| Submission (strikes)
| Cage on Fire 6
| 
| align=center| 2
| align=center| 1:59
| Tijuana, Mexico
|
|-
| Win
| align=center| 1–0
| Gabriel Palmares 
| Decision (unanimous)
| Cage on Fire 5
| 
| align=center| 3
| align=center| 3:00
| Tijuana, Mexico
|
|-

See also
 List of current UFC fighters
 List of male mixed martial artists

References

External links
 
 

Living people
1980 births
Mexican male mixed martial artists
Bantamweight mixed martial artists
Mixed martial artists utilizing boxing
Mexican practitioners of Brazilian jiu-jitsu
Sportspeople from Tijuana
Ultimate Fighting Championship male fighters